Ricky Zoom is a computer-animated children's television series created by Alexander Bar and produced by Hasbro's Entertainment One subsidiary and Frog Box in collaboration with Maga Animation Studio. The series was first released on Youku Kids on June 28, 2019.

Synopsis
Set in the town of Wheelford, the series follows young motorcycle Ricky Zoom and his friends, Loop Hoopla, Scootio Whizzbang and DJ Rumbler. They form the "Bike Buddies" and have adventures in their community, and Ricky dreams of becoming a rescue bike just like his parents and his idol, Steel Awesome.

Characters

Main
 Ricky Zoom (voiced by Max Fincham) is a red motorcycle with dark blue eyes and equipped with rescue gadgets who dreams of becoming a rescue bike like his parents. His symbol is a Z, which stands for his last name.
 Loop Hoopla (voiced by Keith Wickham) is a blue dirt bike with green eyes and paddle tires who can hover via boosters on his side. He loves doing wild stunts. His symbol is a spiral. Loop is the only Bike Buddy other than Ricky to have a sibling, but he is also the only one not to have his mother appear.
 DJ Rumbler is a green 3-wheeled ATV motorcycle with brown eyes, and is equipped with a robotic arm and several tool attachments. His symbol is a criss-crossed screwdriver and hammer. He is extremely strong, capable of pulling several hundred pounds unassisted.
 Scootio Wizzbang (voiced by Finty Williams) is a yellow scooter with blue eyes, and is equipped with a drone called a Zoomcam and miniature robots called ScootBops. She keeps a tablet in her front wheel arch. Her symbol is a sun. Scootio is the only female of the main four Bike Buddies.

Recurring
 Toot Zoom (voiced by Frances White) is a little lavender motorcycle with blue eyes, and Ricky's younger sister. Sweet yet sassy, Toot is always eager to get in on some fun with the Bike Buddies whenever she can – though her habit of recounting embarrassing tales and titbits about Ricky means that although he adores her, he can be resistant to having her around! They think of her rather like an extra set of wheels: nice to have around when you need them, but whoever heard of a bike with four wheels?! However, though smaller than the other buddies, Toot is impossible to ignore – and often ends up stealing the show!
 Hank Zoom is a red adult motorcycle with blue eyes who is Ricky and Toot's father. He has a special job as a rescue bike which Ricky wants to be when he grows up.
 Helen Zoom is an orange adult motorcycle with green eyes who is Ricky and Toot's mother. She had a past life as the Wheelford Wheeler, a bike who rescues those in need and vanishes before anyone found out who she was.
 Dasher Zoom is a Lightblue pre-teenage motorcycle with green eyes which is Ricky and Toot's cousin and Hank and Helen's nephew, he loves racing.
 Steel Awesome is a superhero that Ricky idolizes. Movie star, comic-book hero and huge celebrity, stunt bike Steel Awesome has packs of adoring fans… including himself! Bold, brave and handsome (and doesn't he know it!), he loves doing his own extravagant movie stunts. Though he can be who absurdly over-the-top, Steel is the epitome of what an action bike can be, and Ricky idolises him for it. Ricky dreams of becoming his sidekick, Vroom Boy, so that Steel will teach him all he knows about being a daring and courageous bike. He speaks with an American accent.
 Maxwell is a bike who runs the garage. Good-natured Maxwell and his Service Station are at the heart of the community, providing everything a bike needs along with the latest Wheelford news and gossip, as well as plenty of tales of the good ol’ days! A trusted and valued member of the community, Maxwell is also leader of Ramp Camp, the outdoor club that all the Buddies love being a part of, and he enjoys using his experience of the world to help the Buddies learn and grow.
 Blip Hoopla is Loop's big brother, 13-year-old Blip will deliver just about anything, to anyone, anywhere – but he still has a lot to learn about being a good delivery bike. He seems to have a knack for losing things and, though he tries very hard to be careful, something always seems to upset his deliveries. He sometimes feels that the whole universe is against him.
 Don Hoopla is Blip and Loop's single father is Wheelford's resident mail carrier who takes great pride in making sure every parcel is delivered safely to its rightful owner. A skilled off-road bike like Loop, he delivers the mail come rain, shine, or snow! Don also delivers pizzas in addition to the mail, and always carries pictures of Loop and Blip with him.
 Whoopie Wizzbang is Scootio's mother. She and Helen Zoom used to compete against each other and win when they were in school.
 Fred Wizzbang is Scootio's father.
 Della Rumbler is DJ's mother and a construction worker. Her name is not mentioned in the series.
 Jake Rumbler is DJ's father and a construction worker.
 Officer Bunker is Wheelford's police bike, Officer Bunker takes his duties very seriously indeed! He has committed each and every last rule of the Wheelford Highway Code to heart and patrols its highways and byways ensuring that bikes, both young and old, abide by the rules to ensure the safety of the townsfolk. But behind his strict exterior lies a heart of gold. He's really just a big softy who particularly loves the Bike Buddies, seeing a lot of himself as a young bike in them. He'd love to impart the lessons he's learned since he took off his training wheels — if only they would stay still long enough to listen! He is the only bike that can get out of a pothole on his own.
 Buster Bunker (voiced by Edward Moloney) is Officer Bunker's grandson and Toot's best friend.
 Mrs. Bikely is an enthusiastic and inspiring teacher, Mrs. Bikely is committed to helping her students grow up to be the best bikes they can be. Her spirited and fun lessons and projects help the Bike Buddies develop their initiative, imagination, and independence. She also has a not-so-secret crush on Steel Awesome. Though she is referred to as a "Mrs.", it is unknown if she has ever been married.

Production
On August 22, 2019, it was announced that Hasbro would acquire Entertainment One for $4 billion, giving them ownership of Ricky Zoom. On December 30, 2019, $3.8 billion deal was closed.

On September 5, 2019, it was announced that the series would premiere in the United States on September 9, 2019. On February 9, 2020, it was announced that eOne had renewed the series for a second season containing 52 11-minute episodes, set to premiere around November 2020.

Broadcast
Internationally, the series airs on Super RTL in Germany, Yle TV2 in Finland, Clan TV in Spain, Gulli in France, Nickelodeon and Kabillion in the United States, RAI in Italy, Discovery Kids in Latin America, Karusel in Russia, and ViuTV in Hong Kong. As of April 2020, the series has aired on Channel 5's Milkshake! in the United Kingdom.

Episodes

References

External links
 
 

2010s British children's television series
2010s British animated comedy television series
2020s British children's television series
2010s Chinese television series
2020s Chinese television series
2010s French animated television series
2010s French comedy television series
2020s French animated television series
2020s French comedy television series
2010s Italian television series
2020s Italian television series
2019 British television series debuts
2019 Chinese television series debuts
2019 French television series debuts
2019 Italian television series debuts
2010s preschool education television series
2020s preschool education television series
British computer-animated television series
British children's animated action television series
British children's animated adventure television series
British children's animated comedy television series
British preschool education television series
Chinese children's animated action television series
Chinese children's animated adventure television series
Chinese children's animated comedy television series
French computer-animated television series
French children's animated action television series
French children's animated adventure television series
French children's animated comedy television series
French preschool education television series
Italian computer-animated television series
Italian children's animated action television series
Italian children's animated adventure television series
Italian children's animated comedy television series
Animated preschool education television series
English-language television shows
RAI original programming
Animated television series about children
Animated television series about auto racing
Motorcycle television series
Television series by Entertainment One
Fictional motorcycles